Wholphin was a quarterly DVD magazine containing a selection of short films which had little or no exposure elsewhere. The magazine was created by Dave Eggers and Brent Hoff of McSweeney's publishing house. It was named after the marine animal of the same name, a rare hybrid of a false killer whale and a dolphin, which highlights its unusual nature.

Eggers and Hoff claim they were inspired to create it after the Cannes Film Festival, which is one of very few places at which many of these short films can ever be seen. Short films and documentaries have limited exposure to the general public because, in the words of Hoff, "they're too short to show on TV, and they don't play in theaters because they'd rather show some great trivia about Adam Sandler."

The first issue of Wholphin was released in December 2005, containing among others a documentary by Spike Jonze about Al Gore, by David O. Russell on U.S. soldiers in Iraq, films by Miguel Arteta and Miranda July, David Byrne and Selma Blair, Turkish sitcoms and Iranian animation. Issue 15, the last Wholphin, was published February 2012.

Issues 2, 3, and 4 each came with a bonus DVD of the three parts of the documentary The Power of Nightmares by Adam Curtis. The magazine did not include any advertisement.

References

External links
Official Wholphin website
April 2008 Interview in L.A. Record

Film magazines published in the United States
Quarterly magazines published in the United States
DVD magazines
Magazines established in 2005
Magazines disestablished in 2012
McSweeney's periodicals
Magazines published in San Francisco
Defunct magazines published in the United States
Advertising-free magazines